Roberto Franqueira (born 10 May 1952), known as Tecão, is a Brazilian former footballer. He competed in the men's tournament at the 1976 Summer Olympics and won a gold medal in football at the 1975 Pan American Games.

References

External links
 
 
 

1952 births
Living people
Brazilian footballers
Brazil international footballers
Olympic footballers of Brazil
Footballers at the 1976 Summer Olympics
Footballers from São Paulo
Association footballers not categorized by position
Pan American Games gold medalists for Brazil
Pan American Games medalists in football
Footballers at the 1975 Pan American Games
Medalists at the 1975 Pan American Games